The Theo Heemskerk cabinet was the cabinet of the Netherlands from 12 February 1908 until 29 August 1913. The cabinet was formed by the political party Anti-Revolutionary Party (ARP) and the General League of Roman Catholic Caucuses (ABRK) following the fall of the De Meester cabinet 21 December 1907. The centre-right cabinet was a minority government in the House of Representatives but was supported by Independent Catholics (Ind. C.) and Independent Protestants (Ind. P.) for a majority. After the election of 1909 the Anti-Revolutionary Party and the General League of Roman Catholic Caucuses received a plurality of the votes and the cabinet could continued to govern as a majority government from 27 July 1909. Theo Heemskerk of the Anti-Revolutionary Party was Prime Minister.

Cabinet Members

 Retained this position from the previous cabinet.
 Resigned.
 Served ad interim.
 Died in office.

References

External links

Official

  Kabinet-Heemskerk Parlement & Politiek

Cabinets of the Netherlands
1908 establishments in the Netherlands
1913 disestablishments in the Netherlands
Cabinets established in 1908
Cabinets disestablished in 1913
Minority governments